Ivy Barley is a Ghanaian entrepreneur, program manager and women in tech activist. She is the co-founder of Developers in Vogue, an organization that is paving the way for more African women to take up opportunities in the tech industry.  In January 2022, GhanaWeb featured Barley as one of the 3 Ghanaian ‘Women in Tech’ making strides on the international corporate scene. In 2017 and 2019, Barley was listed as one of the Top 50 Most Influential Young Ghanaians by Avance Media.

Early life and education  
Barley was born in Accra, Ghana, where she spent most of her childhood. She had her secondary education at Aburi Girls Senior High School, after which she pursued a bachelor's degree in Actuarial Science at the Kwame Nkrumah University of Science and Technology. After her first degree, she obtained a master's degree (MPhil.) in Mathematical Statistics at the same university and graduated in 2017.

Career 
Barley currently works as a Technical Program Manager on the Open Education Analytics (OEA) team at Microsoft, which is an open source program which collaborates with education systems across the world to develop modern data intelligence capabilities. OEA is a fully open-sourced data integration and analytics framework for the education sector built on Azure Synapse – with Azure Data Lake Storage as the storage backbone, Azure Active Directory providing role-based access control, and Azure Purview for data discovery and governance.

Prior to joining Microsoft in 2020, Barley started and scaled Developers in Vogue as the CEO. Due to her passion for supporting African women in tech, she has worked as a Digital Skills and Education Consultant at Deutsche Gesellschaft für Internationale Zusammenarbeit (GIZ), where she was in charge of the overall design, organization and implementation of digital skills projects like the training of women in the informal sector of Ghana to help them use technology to boost their businesses and increase their productivity using digital tools  and the eSkills4Girls initiative to promote careers in technology among African women and girls. In December 2018, re:publica came to Africa for the very first time, and she was in charge of designing, implementing and coordinating various women in tech projects on behalf of GIZ during re:publica Accra.

Barley was part of the Global Shaper Community in Accra, which is one of the multi-stakeholder groups in the World Economic Forum between 2017 and 2019 and a Yunus and Youth Fellow. She also worked as a Teaching Assistant in Mathematics, Statistics, Physics and Computer Programming at the African Science Academy in Ghana and a Research and Teaching Assistant at Kwame Nkrumah University of Science and Technology, where she assisted with Regression Analysis, Mathematical Statistics, Statistical Methods for Process Improvement and Biostatistics.

Social entrepreneur 
Barley is the co-founder of Developers in Vogue, an organization that provides training, mentorship and job placement for African women in tech. The impact of Developers in Vogue has been recognized on international platforms including the IFC Sustainability Exchange: Invest for Tomorrow, the Women20 Summit in Berlin, Germany that had Chancellor Angela Merkel in attendance and the ITU International Girls in ICT Day.

Ivy's impact at Developers in Vogue has also been featured in various media platforms and books including the Women in Tech book by the German Federal Ministry of Economic Cooperation and Development to encourage more women and girls to be involved in STEM and the Founding Women book to highlight African women who are defying the odds to build successful businesses in tech.

Impact on Digital Platforms 
Barley uses her digital platforms, especially social media, her blog and newsletter to share tech and career experiences and advocate for women in tech. On Twitter, she hosts live audio conversations via Twitter Spaces called #SpaceswithIvy where she brings in speakers to share their experiences, insights, resources and opportunities in the tech industry. In January 2022, Barley announced the #100DaysChallenge for the tech community in Africa to learn new tech skills and openly share their journey on Twitter. People are learning UI/UX design, data engineering, product management, technical writing, and software development among others in 100 days.

Awards and recognition 

 Dec 2021 | Microsoft Global Hackathon 2021 Challenge Winner
 Nov 2021 | Tech Entrepreneur Award Winner - Africa Women Innovation and Entrepreneurship Forum (AWIEF) Award 
 Mar 2020 | She For Social Impact Awards
 Dec 2019 | Most Influential Young Ghanaian in Science and Technology
 Dec 2019 | Top 50 Most Influential Young Ghanaians
 Nov 2019 | F-LANE Finalist by the Vodafone Institute of Society and Communications 
Nov 2017 | Kwese GoGettaz Competition Finalist
Apr 2017 | Winner, eSkills4Girls competition in Berlin, Germany

References 

Living people
Year of birth missing (living people)
Place of birth missing (living people)
Kwame Nkrumah University of Science and Technology alumni
21st-century Ghanaian women
Ghanaian businesspeople
Ghanaian company founders
Alumni of Aburi Girls' Senior High School